Sandouville is a commune in the Seine-Maritime département in the Normandy region in northern France.

Geography
The commune has two distinct parts: the north contains the village, farms and woodland, the south, separated by the A131 autoroute and the canal de Tancarville, has some port activity, a Renault factory and reclaimed marshland.

Heraldry

Population

Places of interest
 The Pont de Normandie (1995), the cable-stayed bridge over the Seine
 The church of St. Aubin, dating from the twelfth century

See also
Communes of the Seine-Maritime department

References

Communes of Seine-Maritime
Caletes